Bobby Puleo (born 1974) is a regular-footed American professional skateboarder and artist.

Life 
Born in Passaic, New Jersey, Puleo began skateboarding at 10. His first board was the Skull and Sword Powell Peralta board, which he received for Christmas in 1984. Puleo started coming to New York at 16 to skate street spots, like the Brooklyn Banks and others. In 1998, Puleo moved to West 108th Street. Since childhood, Puleo has been a collector of found objects.

Skateboarding career 
Puleo has been a professional skateboarder for over 20 years, Puleo's first pro deck was on Mad Circle skateboards. Puleo was skating a lot with filmer Aaron Meza for the FTC Penal Code 100A video released in 1996. Scott Johnston and Meza introduced Puleo to Justin Girard who put him on Mad Circle. Before Mad Circle, while riding for Metropolitan, Puleo got put on Stereo.

In 2018, Puleo sat down with Transworld Skateboarding to talk about his favorite skateboarder: Mark Gonzales.

Artistic practice 
Building upon his lifelong interest in collecting found objects, Puleo creates collages and assemblages. Puleo also practices photography and has an interest in graffiti. Puleo has shown his art throughout the United States and has an instagram account dedicated to his art: Gutter Gallery In 2003, Puleo opened a show: ''These Eyes Have Eyes," at Space 1026 Gallery in Philadelphia. In 2021, Puleo had a solo show of his assemblages titled "Flat Earth" presented by Hey Check This Out gallery in NYC.

References

External links 

 Bobshirt.com – Interview
 Bobby Puleo – Clues About The Rest Of The World
 Transworld – Skater's Favorite Skater: Bobby Puleo

American skateboarders
Living people
1974 births
Sportspeople from Passaic County, New Jersey
Artists from New Jersey
American contemporary artists
Artist skateboarders
Recycled art artists